Normanbya is a monotypic genus of palms containing the single species Normanbya normanbyi, which is known by the common name black palm It is endemic to Queensland, Australia and is threatened by habitat destruction.

Description
Normanbya normanbyi is visually very similar to the more well-known Foxtail palm but is slightly smaller in all respects. It is a single-stemmed palm with attractive "bushy" fronds, similar to a bottlebrush. The pinnae are dark green on the upper surface and silvery underneath and the tips are abruptly truncated (like a fishtail).

The inflorescence (grouping of flowers) is a panicle and is borne on the trunk just below the crownshaft. The staminate flowers have 24 to 40 stamens, the pistillate flowers have three strongly recurved stigmas.

Taxonomy
The basionym of this species is Cocos normanby, described in 1874 by Walter Hill from a specimen he found on the banks of the Daintree River, and named by him in honour of the then Governor of Queensland Sir Henry Wylie Norman. In 1930 the American botanist Liberty Hyde Bailey reclassified it under its current name.

Distribution and habitat
This species is restricted to a small part of the Wet Tropics of Queensland World Heritage Site, specifically the area from near Cow Bay to just south of the Daintree River near Mossman.

Ecology and uses
Fruits of the Black palm are eaten by cassowaries and sulphur-crested cockatoos. Whilst the cassowary swallows the fruit whole and passes the seed out in its droppings, thereby assisting in spreading the seeds throughout the forest, the cockatoos will remove the fruit's flesh and chew into the seeds themselves, destroying their ability to germinate.

The Kuku Yalanji people, who are the original inhabitants of the area where this palm is found, had many uses for the plant. The very hard timber was split along the length of the trunk to make spears, clapsticks, nulla nullas and digging sticks. The buds and new shoots can be eaten and a fibre made from the crownshafts was used as a string to tie spear heads to the shafts, fish traps and cradles.

Conservation status
In the IUCN's Red List, this species is assessed as vulnerable, but in the Australian state of Queensland (where the plant is endemic) it is considered to be of least concern.

The IUCN cites "land clearance" as the justification for the vulnerable status of Normanbya normanbyi. While much of the area where it grows is protected under both Queensland's National Park system and the World Heritage listing, there is also a significant portion of lowland rainforest that is privately-owned, uncleared land, and which has an uncertain future in regard to the preservation of the natural habitat.

Cultivation
Normanbya normanbyi is visually very similar to the very popular Foxtail palm (Wodyetia bifurcata) but is not as widely planted as the latter. It may be grown from fresh seed and is also available at many plant nurseries. It requires a shady position when young, well-drained soil and plentiful water.

Gallery

References

Ptychospermatinae
Palms of Australia
Vulnerable flora of Australia
Flora of Queensland
Vulnerable biota of Queensland
Monotypic Arecaceae genera
Taxonomy articles created by Polbot